Pits n Pots was an independent news site which focused on the Stoke-on-Trent political scene. Until it ceased publication in August 2012, the site promoted and encouraged comment and debate on the political stories it published. Several Stoke-on-Trent councillors contributed to the site with comments or by having their blogs republished to the site.

History
Although not classed as traditional media, the site was featured on BBC News Online, was mentioned in Hansard and at the future for local and regional media sub committee. The site founder Tony Walley has spoken on BBC Breakfast News & Radio France about the site and what is commonly termed hyperlocal publishing.

Pits n Pots published the story about the British National Party (BNP) using a Polish Spitfire on their posters some 5 days before the national press picked it up.

On 1 August 2011 Tony Walley published a blog  announcing that he was ending his involvement with the site, citing other projects pertaining to his radio broadcasting interests as his reasons for leaving. The site then took a short break from August until late October 2011, when the remaining member of the founding editorial team, Mike Rawlins started to publish articles again.

On 5 December 2011 Mike Rawlins published an article  announcing that Pits n Pots was being supported by the newly formed Journalism Foundation.

References

External links 

Mass media in Stoke-on-Trent
Local mass media in England
English websites
2012 disestablishments in England